Michel Noir (born 19 May 1944) is a French politician.

Political career

Governmental functions

Minister of Foreign Trade : 1986-1988

Electoral mandates

National Assembly of France

Member of the National Assembly for Rhône : 1978-1986 (Became minister in 1986) / 1988-1995 (Resignation). Elected in 1978, reelected in 1981, 1986, 1988, 1993.

Municipal Council

Mayor of Lyon : 1989–1995.

Deputy-mayor of Lyon : 1983–1989.

Municipal councillor of Lyon : 1977–1995. Reelected in 1983, 1989.

Urban community Council

President of the Urban Community of Lyon : 1989–1995.

Member of the Urban Community of Lyon : 1977–1995. Reelected in 1983, 1989.

References

1944 births
Living people
Mayors of Lyon
Rally for the Republic politicians
University of Lyon alumni
20th-century French diplomats
Government ministers of France
Members of Parliament for Rhône